Qarano is a river of the Nile basin. Rising in the mountains of Dogu’a Tembien in northern Ethiopia, it flows eastward to empty in Giba and Tekezé River.

Characteristics 
It is a confined ephemeral river, locally meandering in its narrow alluvial plain, with an average slope gradient of 45 metres per kilometre. With its tributaries, the river has cut a deep gorge.

Flash floods and flood buffering

Runoff mostly occurs in the form of high runoff discharge events that occur in a very short period (called flash floods). These are related to the steep topography, often little vegetation cover and intense convective rainfall. The peaks of such flash floods have often a 50 to 100 times larger discharge than the preceding baseflow.
The magnitude of floods in this river has however been decreased due to interventions in the catchment. 

At Addilal and on other steep slopes, exclosures have been established; the dense vegetation largely contributes to enhanced infiltration, less flooding and better baseflow. Physical conservation structures such as stone bunds and check dams intercept runoff.

Boulders and pebbles in the river bed
Boulders and pebbles encountered in the Qarano river bed can originate from any location higher up in the catchment, and are either made of Antalo Limestone or freshwater tufa

Natural boundary
During its course, this river passes through three municipalities and constitutes different borders. On the various parts:
 Addilal at the north
 Emni Ankelalu at the east
 Addi Azmera at the west and southwest

Trekking along the river
Trekking routes have been established across and along this river. The tracks are not marked on the ground but can be followed using downloaded .GPX files.
 Trek 23, along the upper part of the river
In the rainy season, flash floods may occur and it is advised not to follow the river bed.

See also 
 List of Ethiopian rivers

References

Rivers of Ethiopia
Dogu'a Tembien
Tigray Region
Nile basin